is a Japanese footballer.

Career statistics

Club

Notes

References

Living people
2001 births
Japanese footballers
Japanese expatriate footballers
Association football midfielders
Japan Soccer College players
Singapore Premier League players
Albirex Niigata Singapore FC players
Japanese expatriate sportspeople in Singapore
Expatriate footballers in Singapore